Burrough Court is a former stately home in Burrough on the Hill near Melton Mowbray in the East Midlands, England. Burrough Court was once the site of a large country house of which today only the stable yard, chauffeur's and grooms' quarters remain. The remaining buildings have now been converted into office suites, meeting rooms and a conference centre.

History
The house was built in 1905 by H. C. Allfey and it later belonged to Marmaduke Furness, 1st Viscount Furness, who used it as a hunting box. During this time Burrough Court became a rendezvous for the hunting society of Melton; in the autumn of 1930 Burrough Court was the backdrop to the first meeting between, Edward VIII, Prince of Wales, and Mrs. Wallis Simpson. The main house burned down at the end of World War II, allegedly due to some Canadian soldiers using explosives to get to a sealed wine cellar. The romance between the Prince of Wales, and Mrs. Wallis Simpson was initiated when both were invited by Thelma, Viscountess Furness to a house-party at Burrough Court. According to Wallis' memoirs, in November 1930 Mr. and Mrs. Simpson were supposedly invited as last minute chaperones to Thelma and the Prince of Wales to hunt at her house in Melton Mowbray.

References

Bibliography
 Stephen Birmingham, Duchess, The story of Wallis Warfield Windsor,(1969), London: Futura Publications 
 Ursula Bloom, The Duke of Windsor, (1972), London: Robert Hale 

Country houses in Leicestershire
Somerby, Leicestershire